Susie van der Meer (born 1973) is a German singer-songwriter. She is known primarily around the world for her contribution to the Run Lola Run soundtrack, with her song Somebody Has To Pay.

External links
Official site (in German)

German  women singer-songwriters
Living people
1973 births
21st-century German  women singers
Date of birth missing (living people)
Place of birth missing (living people)